Arthur James Jeyes was an English football left half who made one appearance in the Football League for Clapton Orient.

Personal life 
Jeyes served as a gunner in the British Army during the First World War.

Career statistics

References

English footballers
English Football League players
Leyton Orient F.C. players
Association football wing halves
1890 births
Year of death missing
Footballers from Stepney
British Army personnel of World War I
British Army soldiers